Delhi Daredevils are a franchise cricket team based in Delhi, India, which plays in the Indian Premier League (IPL). They were one of the eight teams that competed in the 2008 Indian Premier League. They were captained by Virender Sehwag. Delhi Daredevils finished fourth in the IPL and did not qualify for the Champions League T20.

Indian Premier League

Standings
Delhi Daredevils finished fourth in the league stage of IPL 2008.

Match log

Statistics

References

Delhi Capitals seasons
2008 Indian Premier League